The Little Eau Pleine River is a river in the U.S. state of Wisconsin.

It is a tributary of the Wisconsin River, as the Little Eau Pleine River originates near Unity. The Menominee name of the river is Manōmenāskon-Sipiah, "rice stalks river", referring to the importance of wild rice as a staple in the traditional Menominee and Ojibwe diets.

References 

Rivers of Wisconsin
Rivers of Clark County, Wisconsin
Rivers of Marathon County, Wisconsin